The mayor of Honolulu is the chief executive officer of the City and County of Honolulu. An office established in 1900 and modified in 1907, the mayor of Honolulu is elected by universal suffrage of residents of Honolulu to no more than two four-year terms. The City and County of Honolulu's elected officials include the mayor, the prosecuting attorney, and councilmembers representing nine districts.

The mayor of Honolulu has full control over appointment and removal of administrators, is invested with absolute control over department heads, wields veto power over the Honolulu City Council and has substantial control over the budget, totaling in excess of US$1 billion.

Honolulu Hale and other offices

The mayor of Honolulu conducts official business from Honolulu Hale, the historic city hall building of Honolulu constructed in 1928 in classical Spanish villa architectural styles. The building is located at the northeast corner of King and Punchbowl streets in the Hawaii Capital Historic District near downtown Honolulu. Other administrative officers under the mayor of Honolulu work from separate municipal buildings on the larger civic campus of which Honolulu Hale is a part.

Domestic policy

From the courtyard of Honolulu Hale, the mayor of Honolulu is mandated by the City and County charters to make an annual State of the City address. In this speech, the mayor of Honolulu outlines the administrative and legislative agenda for the year. It is also a summation of the budget to be implemented compared to the budget of the previous year.

The mayor of Honolulu also organizes the major public services managed by the mayor’s office. The mayor oversees dozens of departments, including: Honolulu Board of Water Supply, Honolulu Fire Department, Honolulu Police Department and the Oahu Civil Defense Agency. Unlike most United States mayors, the mayor of Honolulu does not oversee any schools, a jurisdiction of the Hawaii State Department of Education.

Managing director

Assisting the mayor of Honolulu in overseeing these departments and other domestic policy issues is the managing director of Honolulu. The managing director's most important role is to serve as acting mayor in absence or resignation. The current managing director is Michael Formby.

Foreign policy
Honolulu is often considered the "Geneva of the Pacific" due to its commercial and trade, political and military, as well as academic influences over Asia and the Pacific Rim.  Honolulu is the site of several international governmental and non-governmental organizations and summits, as well as the site of high-profile multinational military exercises called RIMPAC. RIMPAC is conducted by the commander-in-chief of the United States Pacific Command whose headquarters is in Honolulu’s Salt Lake subdivision.

The uniqueness of Honolulu’s significance to the global community has forced the mayor of Honolulu to assume a constant diplomatic role that goes beyond the foreign policy roles of almost all other United States mayors. The mayor of Honolulu serves as concurrent chairman of several multinational mayoral bodies and convenes special sessions of international summits regularly.

First Lady of Honolulu

As a Hawaiian tradition, the wife of the mayor of Honolulu is honored with the ceremonial title of "First Lady of Honolulu." Honolulu is distinct in this tradition as most United States cities and towns reserve the title of "First Lady" to the wife of the state governor, the wife of the president of the United States or the wife of a visiting foreign head of government. Honolulu deemed it necessary to bestow the ceremonial title to reflect her role in relation to her husband’s extensive international responsibilities. The title is not codified in modern law but is an honorific.

List of mayors of Honolulu

Notable candidates and acting mayors
 D. G. Anderson
 Duke Bainum
 Kirk Caldwell, acting mayor of Honolulu from July to October 2010
 Charles Djou
 Colleen Hanabusa
 Ben Lee
 Patsy Mink

Resources
 City & County of Honolulu
 Agencies and Departments

See also

 Timeline of Honolulu

Notes

Honolulu
Government of Honolulu